The Marajoara or Marajó culture was an ancient pre-Columbian era civilization that flourished on Marajó island at the mouth of the Amazon River in northern Brazil. In a survey, Charles C. Mann suggests the culture appeared to flourish between 800 AD and 1400 AD, based on archeological studies. Researchers have documented that there was human activity at these sites as early as 1000 BC. The culture seems to have persisted into the colonial era.

Background

Archeologists have found sophisticated pottery in their excavations on the island. These pieces are large, and elaborately painted and incised with representations of plants and animals. These provided the first evidence that a complex society had existed on Marajó. Evidence of mound building further suggests that well-populated, complex and sophisticated settlements developed on this island, as only such settlements were believed capable of such extended projects as major earthworks.

The extent, level of complexity, and resource interactions of the Marajoara culture have been disputed. Working in the 1950s in some of her earliest research, American Betty Meggers suggested that the society migrated from the Andes and settled on the island. 

In the 1980s, another American archeologist, Anna Curtenius Roosevelt, led excavations and geophysical surveys of the mound Teso dos Bichos. She concluded that the society that constructed the mounds originated on the island itself.

The pre-Columbian culture of Marajó may have developed social stratification and supported a population as large as 100,000 people. The Native Americans of the Amazon rain forest may have used their method of developing and working in terra preta to make the land suitable for the large-scale agriculture needed to support large populations and complex social formations such as chiefdoms.

Origin of the mounds
Rossetti et al. proposed that the archaeological settlements associated with isolated or compound mounds were "systematically developed on top of extensive elevated surfaces formed due to natural sedimentary processes".

Thus, the large Marajoara mounds or tesos are not entirely manmade. Rather, the inhabitants took advantage of the natural, preexisting elevated surfaces and added on top of those to build their earthworks. This interpretation suggests less cumulative labor investment in the construction of the mounds.

"Several mounds on Marajo Island and several in Bolivia have yielded radiocarbon dates as early as 1000 to 300 BC in early levels, suggesting that the first mounds of the tradition were built in the Formative, the period when horticulture appears to become widespread for the first time."

The earliest phase of human activity and moundbuilding on Marajo Island is known as the 'Ananatuba phase'. The Castanheira site of that phase is an artificial mound.

Agriculture and economy

Plant remains on Marajo Island show a subsistence pattern that relied heavily on small seed crops, as well as small fish, which were either cultivated or protected by indigenous peoples. Many of the carbonized seed remains have not yet been identified, though they seem to be herbaceous and derived from local grasses (Roosevelt 1991: 377, 405). Trees such as the açai and tucuma palms also provided important supplements in the Marajo diet, as well being used for manufacturing items such as baskets or canoes (Roosevelt 1991; Meggers 1957). Evidence from human remains shows that Marajo peoples limited their consumption of starchy root crops like manioc; rather, the heavy wear patterns of teeth suggest a diet based predominantly on seed crops, tree fruits, and fish (Roosevelt 1991: 394-395). Since small fish make up the majority of biomass fauna and there are relatively few terrestrial animals, it follows that pre-historic peoples focused on the abundant populations of small fish (Roosevelt 1991: 23). The method for catching fish was likely very similar to present-day techniques, which involves stunning fish with the poisonous liana plant and collecting them as they float to the surface. This method of mass harvesting is not as useful in the rainy season as it is during the dry months when fish are trapped in receding streams or ponds (Roosevelt 1991: 382-383).

The agricultural technology at Marajo is limited to, primarily, stone axes that were introduced in the Marajoara Phase (Meggers 1957: 603). Other stone artifacts include griddles found at Teso Dos Bichos during Roosevelt’s excavations, although these are very rare. Their rarity is another marker of the absence of root crops from the diet at Marajo (Roosevelt 1991: 378).

Earthen mounds, unlike lithic artifacts, are abundant. They were used for cemetery purposes as well as for habitation, as the low-lying areas are prone to flooding in the rainy season. Mounds may have served a defensive purpose too. Pre-historic peoples of Marajo Island may have also constructed ramps, canals, ponds, and drained fields found near earthworks mounds, but most of the evidence has likely been buried by sediment in seasonal floods (Roosevelt 1991: 33).

Evidence for trade networks at Marajo is found mostly in lithics, because the island has no local source of suitable igneous or metamorphic rock (Roosevelt 1991: 9, 348; Meggers 1957: 371). None of the lithic artifacts have been sourced, although they are primarily made from a green, microcrystalline mafic rock (Roosevelt 1991: 348). Such greenstones are typically more associated with Mesoamerica, a possible point of origin for Marajo’s imported stone.

An increased complexity of ceremonial wares and uniformity of utilitarian wares occurred with the Marajoara phase, suggesting ceramic manufacture became a specialized industry at this time. Sometime into the Marajoara phase, however, there was a decline in characteristics that indicate specialization of ceramics (Meggers 1957: 403-404).

Architecture
Many of the excavations on Marajo island have focused on the largest earthen mound sites (Meggers 1957). Smaller mounds and non-mound sites likely outnumber them (Roosevelt 1991: 33).

Multi-level stratification of sites by size (Roosevelt 1991: 39):
 3 to 4 very large multi-mound sites such as Os Camutins with 40 mounds, or Fortaleza with 20 (Roosevelt 1991: 33). These housed several thousand people; e.g. Os Camutins had a population of about 10,000 (Roosevelt 1991: 38)
 Many more smaller multi-mound sites with 3 to 5 mounds each, for example Monte Carmelo (Roosevelt 1991: 33)
 Numerous single mound sites, such as Teso do Sitio (Roosevelt 1991: 33). These housed between a few hundred and about a thousand people (Roosevelt 1991: 38)
 Countless low-mound and non-mound sites

Mounds predominate in the lowest areas that are most prone to severe flooding (Roosevelt 1991: 31). They were constructed of earthen materials, and garbage was used as fill to maintain them (Roosevelt 1991: 37).

The mounds served many purposes (Roosevelt 1991: 333-334, 401-402), for example as cemeteries, for habitation, for militaristic defense, and as defense against seasonal flooding

The mounds housed residential structures similar to present-day malocas, which are Amazonian longhouses (Roosevelt 1991: 37). These were multi-family structures with several hearths lined up along the center of the building; each hearth  likely represented one nuclear family (Roosevelt 1991: 37). The malocas were arranged east to west (Roosevelt 1991: 37) and generally grouped in a concentric oval pattern (Roosevelt 1991: 401). They were built of earth, wooden poles, and thatch roofs (Roosevelt 1991: 37). They were occupied continually as evidenced by superimposed layers of structures (Roosevelt 1991: 335), with up to 20 structures built atop one another at some places, such as Os Camutins (Roosevelt 1991: 38). There were permanent cooking facilities made of baked clay and plastered floors, which were frequently repaired over time (Roosevelt 1991: 38, 334-335).

There are also monumental earthworks, causeways, ramps, canals, ponds, and drained fields that have been buried by extensive sedimentation (Roosevelt 1991: 33, 331-333, 422)

Artifacts

Travelers in the 1800s noted both the presence of mounds and the beauty of the ceramics found inside them or exposed on their sides. Museums in Europe and the United States began to collect some of the larger and more beautiful pieces, the largest of which are funerary urns. Buried in house floors constructed on the tops of the mounds, the elaborately decorated urns contain the remains of significant individuals. When the individuals died, the flesh was cleared from their bones and the remains were placed in the urns, which were topped with a bowl or platter.

The people on Marajo produced many diverse artifacts (Roosevelt 1991: 59-60) such as pottery vessels (urns, jars, bottles, cups, bowls, plates, dishes), figurines, large statues, pubic covers, pendants, ear and lip jewelry, whistles, spindle whorls, and ceramic miniatures of axes, mashers, hammers, and other tools. Lithics were very rare because Marajo island has no source of suitable stone (Roosevelt 1991: 9, 348; Meggers 1957: 371). Lithics that have been found suggest they were used as high-status items and gifts, or they were used in craft production (Roosevelt 1991: 396).

Elaborate pottery vessels were found in garbage fills between houses and in graves, but not around hearths, which contained only plain domestic wares (Roosevelt 1991: 37, 402). Additionally, the low mound and non-mound sites contain very little if any fineware (Roosevelt 1991: 37). Some artifacts are found only at specific sites; for example, Teso dos Bichos contains thousands of small ceramic and sandstone abraders, which are very rare or absent from other sites (Roosevelt 1991: 37).

The general pattern of change found throughout artifacts on Marajo, especially in ceramics, is one that moves toward more complex, elaborate, and specialized wares through the Marajoara Phase. But later in the Marajoara Phase, specialization and complexity declined. (Roosevelt 1991; Meggers 1957).

Leadership and inequality
Although some characteristics do point to stratification, the evidence regarding inequality and leadership is inconclusive as to whether it was gender or class based, or whether it represented centralized rule (Roosevelt 1991: 411). The existence of large mounds and large, multi-family malocas, complex crafts, and intensive subsistence is typically interpreted as evidence for centralized authority and stratified socioeconomic classes, but this is not an empirically supported assumption (Roosevelt 1991: 417). However, the data regarding leadership is inconclusive as to whether or not there was centralized rule (Roosevelt 1991: 420). Ethnohistoric records describe civic-ceremonial leaders, but the Marajoara existed several centuries prior to European contact and may have been quite different from the later contact-period societies. Marajoara iconography doesn’t suggest a centralized political authority, but does suggest social ranking based on matrilineal genealogy (Roosevelt 1991: 398, 408). 

Skeletal traits also point to some sort of stratification, likely between elites and commoners. It was very clear through bone analysis that some individuals were well-nourished and tall, while others were significantly shorter and consumed poorer diets. Further, some skull deformation among the well-nourished skeletons also point to an elite class (Roosevelt 1991: 399). Despite the current evidence, only a few individuals have been examined. A more comprehensive, systematic investigation of burials and houses is required to tell whether the differentiation in food production and consumption was based on class or gender (Roosevelt 1991: 403, 417).

There is evidence that women held a lower status relative to men in Marajo, but other evidence suggests women commanded more importance and higher status than they do in contemporary Amazonia. Interpretations of the society are difficult to define. (Roosevelt 1991: 410-411). For example, women are featured prominently in Marajoara art, portrayed as creators and lineage heroes or founders. Also, households were matrilocal and women were important in subsistence production. Amazonian ethnohistory describes many floodplain societies with matrilineal descent reckoned from a mythical female ancestor. Amazonian ethnohistorical evidence also points to women holding high socioeconomic status, as well as holding leading political and ritual roles (Roosevelt 1991: 411).

The fact that women are largely absent from elaborate burial urns and number very few at all compared to male skeletons could be regarded as evidence for gender stratification. However, high-ranking women do not always hold political positions and thus their absence from elaborate burials doesn’t necessarily indicate lower status (Roosevelt 1991: 409).

Low-mound and non-mound sites have far fewer, if any, elaborate ceramics. Additionally, elaborate ceramics are found only in garbage and burial contexts, not around hearths (Roosevelt 1991: 339-340). This could suggest that women primarily made and used domestic plainware, while men primarily controlled ceremonial fineware (Roosevelt 1991: 407). Nonetheless, the true relationship between ceramic distribution and social rank is still unclear and needs to be further investigated (Roosevelt 1991: 396).

Religion and ideology
The belief system of the Marajo people is not wholly understood, though it almost certainly involved important female figures (Roosevelt 1991). Marajoara iconography and art portrays women with shamanistic powers and roles (Roosevelt 1991: 410), consistent with societies that reckon descent through a mythical female ancestor. There were parallels to Amazonian cosmology, which understands the universe to be gender divided, with men related to the sun and women to the moon. Further, ancestral females regarded as creators in Amazonian cosmology may be represented in Marajoaran iconography (Roosevelt 1991: 412). Marajo settlement patterns are aligned east-to-west, consistent with a gender-divided universe (Roosevelt 1991: 413). It is possible that ancestor worship was very important, as the deceased were placed in urns and buried in the mounds that the Marajoarans used for residence (Roosevelt 1991).

Death
The most common type of tomb is the burial urn (Roosevelt 1991: 44). Grave goods typically include lithics and elaborate ceramics (Roosevelt 1991: 396).
The skeletal remains preserve very well in burial urns, which were covered with a clayey soil (Roosevelt 1991: 426).
Few female skeletons have been found yet (Roosevelt 1991: 409).
"My sources did not discuss the causes of death, but did state there the available skeletons showed relatively few pathologies and lived healthier lives with more nutritious diets than post-contact Amazonians" (Roosevelt 1991: 394).
Despite the importance, abundance, and ease of excavation, very few Marajo cemeteries have been systematically excavated and analyzed (Roosevelt 1991: 387).

Warfare and violence
While skeletal remains have not been analyzed for trauma patterns yet, they do show peculiar signs of muscle development that strongly suggest regular participation in warfare (Roosevelt 1991: 406-407). The patterns of muscle development are similar to those in modern wrestlers, who practice and train specifically to wrestle. Finding similar muscle development suggests Marajoarans trained for combat. 
The earthen mounds could clearly serve defensive purposes in addition to flood protection. 
Other than the defensive position of residences atop earthen mounds, there really is little evidence that can either confirm or deny the existence of warfare or localized violence. However, the presence of warfare in every other society around the world makes it unlikely that Marajoarans lived in utter peace and tranquility.

Art and symbolism

The most common motif found in Marajoara iconography involves female imagery (Roosevelt 1991: 410-415) such as females as mythical ancestors, creators, cultural heroes, or females portrayed in shamanistic roles and with shamanistic power. These female motifs are typically found on ceramic artifacts, either pottery vessels or statues (Roosevelt 1991).

Collapse
Marajo Island is thought to have been occupied until shortly before European conquest, which puts the abandonment date around AD 1300 (Roosevelt 1991: 405). 
Abandonment is determined by the fact that structures ceased to be repaired and maintained, and no further building occurred after this time (Roosevelt 1991; Meggers 1957). The factors causing the island to be abandoned have not yet been determined.(Roosevelt 1991: 97, 405)

Ceramics

Travelers in the 1800s noted both the presence of mounds and the beauty of the ceramics found inside them or exposed on their sides. Museums in Europe and the United States began to collect some of the larger and more beautiful pieces, the largest of which are funerary urns. Buried in house floors constructed on the tops of the mounds, the elaborately decorated urns contain the remains of significant individuals. When the individuals died, the flesh was cleared from their bones and the remains were placed in the urns, which were then topped with a bowl or platter.

In addition to the urns, ceramic artifacts include plates, bowls, vases, and tangas (female pubic coverings).

Notes

Bibliography
Meggers, Betty J. and Evans, Clifford. Archaeological Investigations at the Mouth of the Amazon, U.S. G.P.O., Washington, D.C., 1957.
Roosevelt, Anna C. Moundbuilders of the Amazon: Geophysical Archaeology on Marajo Island, Brazil. San Diego, CA: Academic Press, 1991.

External links

Marajoara culture artwork, National Museum of the American Indian

Pre-Columbian cultures
Archaeological cultures of South America
Pre-Columbian indigenous peoples of the Amazon
Amazon basin
Indigenous peoples in Brazil